The Parthon de Von family is a Belgian noble family of French origin., Its members rose to prominent positions in justice and diplomacy.

The family is documented since 1575 in the duchy of Châteauroux, where it acquired the land of Von in 1776.,  It emigrated to Belgium following the French Revolution of 1830, unwilling to serve King Louis-Philippe I. An hereditary title of Knight was conceded to the family by King Leopold I of Belgium in 1856.  The current holder is François (b. 1964) and heir apparent Gautier Parthon de Von (b. 1996).

History

Origin in Berry 
The proven filiation of the Parthon family go back to the 16th century in Châteauroux, where its members held some offices in the judiciary and in the duchy's Waters and Forests.

Estienne Parthon, living in 1575, is lawyer in parliament and spouse of Marguerite de Billon.
 Pierre Parthon (1649–1727), spouse of Anne Basset, mayor of Châteauroux in 1689.
 Sulpice Parthon (1714-1793), spouse of Marie Pelletier, King's Advocate in 1776.

Michel Parthon, one of the leaders of the bourgeois militia of Châteauroux, acquired the land of Von in Saint-Victor, a small town near Châteauroux.

Establishment in Belgium 

The Knight Parthon de Von (1788-1877), appointed consul of France in Ostend circa 1815, attaché to the military household of the King of France, made Knight of the French Legion of Honour in 1827, he was appointed consul of France in Antwerp in 1829.

After the July Revolution in 1830, he refused to serve the new liberal government and resigned as consul of France. He settled near Anvers at the Château de Middelheim and he devoted himself to horticulture and writing. He published a book of fables in 1843. The Belgian horticulturist Charles Morren dedicated to him the Orchiaceae Parthoni.

From his marriage on May 31, 1813 to Jeanne van de Velde:,

 Édouard Parthon de Von (1814-1897), married to Countess Amélie de Coopmans-Yoldi in 1849, daughter of Christian XII's chamberlain, and of Pépita de Yoldi, Countess of Castille.
 Henri Parthon de Von (1819-1892).
 Jeanne Parthon de Von (1822-1911), married to the Baron Charles de Vivario de Ramezée and of the Holy Roman Empire.

Genealogy 
The Annuaire de la noblesse de Belgique (1851) gives the following filiation: 
 Sulpice Parthon (1714–1793), King’s Advocate, ∞ Marie Pelletier.
 François Parthon de Von (1753–18..), artillery officer, ∞ Andrée Thoinnet de la Turmelière.
 Knight Édouard Parthon de Von (1788–1877) ∞ Jeanne Catherine Victoire van de Velde.

The État présent de la noblesse du royaume de Belgique (1960) gives the following filiation:

 Knight Édouard Parthon de Von (1814-1897), ∞ Countess Amélie de Coopmans-Yoldi.
 Knight Alphonse Parthon de Von (1858-1932), Horrues' burgomaster, ∞ Marie Fontaine de Ghélin.
 Knight Édouard Parthon de Von (1881-1945), vice-consul of France, then of Spain, ∞ Jonkvrouw Yvonne de Séjournet.

The État présent de la noblesse belge (2002) gives the following filiation:

 Knight Étienne Parthon de Von (1916-1945) ∞ Françoise de Bonnières.,
 Knight François Parthon de Von (°1964) ∞ Sophie de La Peschardière.
 Jonkheer Gautier Parthon de Von (°1996).

Nobility 
An exchange dated July 19, 1843 between the French government, through its Minister of Foreign Affairs François Guizot, and the Belgian ambassador to France, the Prince of Ligne, allowed the family to obtain a confirmation and concession of nobility on January 2, 1845 by letters patent of Leopold I.

Two titles of knights, transmissible by order of masculine primogeniture, were granted by royal decrees dated September 26, 1856 in favor of Édouard (1814-1897) and Henri Parthon de Von (1819-1892). The latter died without posterity, therefore one title subsists today in favor of the elder branch.

Heraldry

Sepulture 
It holds a perpetual concession for its members in the Laeken Cemetery of Brussels, Belgium since the mid-19th century.

Alliances 
Bilhon, Catherinot (1643), Basset, Thoinnet de La Turmelière (1779), Van de Velde (1813), de Coopmans(1849), Cogels, Fontaine de Ghélin (1880), du Bois (1880), de Séjournet de Rameignies (1905), de La Kethulle de Ryhove (1928), de Bonnières (1962), Béchet de La Peschardière (1984), d'Eimar de Jabrun, Thélot (2012), Fayet (2013), Bernard, etc.

See also 

List of noble families in Belgium
 Belgian nobility

References

Resources

Bibliography 
 Annuaire de la noblesse de Belgique, Volume 5, 1851, page 248.
 Charles Poplimont, La Belgique héraldique,, tome 8, 1866, page 266.</ref>
 La noblesse belge, Partie 1, 1893, page 234.
 baron Fernand de Ryckman de Betz, Armorial général de la noblesse belge, H. Dessain, 1957, page 356.
 Oscar Coomans of Brachène, this State of the Belgian nobility, the 1979 Yearbook, second part P-Pos, Brussels, 1979.
 Grands notables du Premier Empire : Indre, Centre national de la recherche scientifique, 1994.
 Jean-François Houtart, Belgium Old families, LXI Collection of the Royal Family Office Association and heraldry of Belgium, Brussels, 2008.
 Directory of Belgian nobility, 1851.

Surnames
Belgian noble families
French noble families